Alessandro Volpe (born 4 January 1983) is an Italian footballer who plays as a midfielder.

Career
Born in Rome, capital of Lazio region and Italy, Volpe started his career at S.S. Lazio. In July 2004 Volpe left for Serie B club Ternana. In 2005, he was signed by Olbia. After a season in 2005–06 Serie C2, Volpe was signed by Empoli F.C. but loaned back to Sardinia for 2006–07 Serie C2. In 2007 Olbia re-signed half of the registration rights, and bought outright in June 2008.

Volpe left for Lanciano in mid-2008. After half season in 2008–09 Lega Pro Prima Divisione, Volpe returned to Olbia. On 31 August 2009 Volpe left for Monopoli.

On 14 August 2013 he moved to Lega Pro Prima Divisione club Salernitana in a 2-year contract.

In summer 2015 he was signed by Lupa Castelli Romani. On 4 January 2016 he moved to cross town rival Lupa Roma.

References

External links
 Football.it Profile 

Italian footballers
S.S. Lazio players
Ternana Calcio players
Olbia Calcio 1905 players
S.S. Virtus Lanciano 1924 players
Association football midfielders
1983 births
Living people